Dryopidae is a family of beetles, commonly named long-toed water beetles, in the superfamily Byrrhoidea. It was described by Gustaf Johan Billberg in 1820.

Description
Long-toed water beetles are named for their extended claws. Adults have dense hairs, which allow the beetles to breathe while underwater. The flight muscles of the females weaken as they age.

When the pupae complete the imago stage of their life cycle, they move towards running water, and may be attracted to lights.

Despite being referred to as aquatic insects, the beetles are unable to swim, clinging to detritus that float. All long-toed water beetles feed on plants that are in the water, but the larvae generally are terrestrial, and at least some also feed on plant matter. Stygoparnus is the only genus in the family in which both the larvae and adults are aquatic.

Genera of the family closely resemble riffle beetles, but the antennae are different from the long-toed water beetles, looking similar to clubs.

Habitat
Members of this family are found on every continent, except Antarctica and Australia, being more common in the tropics. In 2005, a possible fossilized specimen of Dryopidae was found in the Crato Formation by entomologists David Grimaldi and Michael S. Engel.

Beetles that have water as a habitat, including long-toed water beetles, can help show the quality of fresh water.

Genera
 Ahaggaria Bollow, 1938
 Ceradryops Hinton, 1937
 Drylichus Heller, 1916
 Dryops Olivier, 1791
 Elmomorphus Sharp, 1888
 Elmoparnus Sharp, 1882
 Geoparnus Besuchet, 1978
 Guaranius Spangler, 1991
 Helichus Erichson, 1847
 Holcodryops Spangler, 1987
 Malaiseianus Bollow, 1940
 Onopelmus Spangler, 1980
 Oreoparvus Delève, 1965
 Pelonomus Erichson, 1847
 Phallodryops Delève, 1963
 Postelichus Nelson, 1989
 Protoparnus Sharp, 1883
 Pseudopelonomus Brown, 1981
 Quadryops Perkins & Spangler, 1985
 Rapnus Grouvelle, 1899
 Sostea Pascoe, 1860
 Sosteamorphus Hinton, 1936
 Strina Redtenbacher, 1867
 Stygoparnus Barr & Spangler, 1992
 Uenodryops Satô, 1981
 Palaeoriohelmis Bollow, 1940
 Potamophilites Haupt, 1956

References

 
Byrrhoidea
Beetle families